The 1965 Liga Femenina de Baloncesto was the 2nd edition of the Spanish premier women's basketball championship. It took place from 24 January to 11 April 1965. Ten teams took part in the championship and CREFF Madrid won its second title. No teams were relegated, but Indo Barcelona renounced at the end of the season. Estudiantes Vigo and Mataró Molfort's were promoted from Segunda División.

First round

Group A

Group B

Finals

Round 1

Round 2

Round 3

External links
Official website

Femenina
Liga Femenina de Baloncesto seasons
Spain